Rentz's false shieldback (Aroegas rentzi) is a species of katydid that is endemic to South Africa, and can be found in Limpopo, Mpumalanga, KwaZulu-Natal and Eastern Cape provinces.

References

Tettigoniidae
Endemic insects of South Africa
Insects described in 1996